West Runton railway station is on the Bittern Line in Norfolk, England, serving the village of West Runton.

It is one of two remaining Midland and Great Northern Joint Railway stations still in use on the National Rail network (Cromer being the other). Sheringham and Weybourne are the other two surviving M&GNJR stations, both still served today on the heritage North Norfolk Railway.

The station is managed by Greater Anglia, which also operates all passenger trains that call.

All services to this station are run by Class 755 units. Like other stations on the Norwich - Sheringham line, West Runton is cared for by volunteers known as station adopters.

Services

As of May 2020 the typical Monday to Saturday service at West Runton is one train an hour in both directions between Norwich and Sheringham. On Sundays, the service is every two hours. The Bittern line timetable has not been affected by Greater Anglia's timetable reductions related to the Coronavirus pandemic.

External links

  
  

West Runton
Railway stations in Norfolk
DfT Category F2 stations
Former Midland and Great Northern Joint Railway stations
Railway stations in Great Britain opened in 1887
Greater Anglia franchise railway stations